Tatsuo Matsumura may refer to:

 Tatsuo Matsumura (1914–2005), Japanese actor
 Tatsuo Matsumura (admiral) (1868–1932), Imperial Japanese Navy admiral